William Cloud "Will" Robinson, Jr. is a Republican member of the Florida Legislature representing the state's 71st House district, which includes parts of Manatee and Sarasota counties.

Florida House of Representatives
Robinson defeated Democrat Tracy Pratt in the November 6, 2018 general election, winning 55.59% of the vote.

References

Republican Party members of the Florida House of Representatives
Living people
21st-century American politicians
University of Notre Dame alumni
Stetson University College of Law alumni
1975 births